Schnusimyia parvula is a species of ulidiid or picture-winged fly in the genus Schnusimyia of the family Ulidiidae.

References

Ulidiidae